The 2022–23 Minnesota Whitecaps season is the team's fifth year as a member of the Premier Hockey Federation.  Before this season, they moved to their new home rink at Richfield Ice Arena.  The Whitecaps started the season on Saturday, November 5th at Canlan Ice Sports – York, losing to the Toronto Six in overtime.

Offseason 

On May 17, 2022, the Whitecaps announced that Jack Brodt, who co-founded the team in 2004, would take a position with NLTT Hockey, the company who bought the Whitecaps last season.  Ronda Curtin Engelhardt took over as sole Head Coach of the team.

On July 29, 2022, the Whitecaps announced that they would move from TRIA Rink to Richfield Ice Arena.

On August 21, 2022, Chi-Yin Tse was named as the new General Manager for the Whitecaps.

Schedule and results

Standings

Regular season

The regular season schedule was published on Monday, September 19, 2022. All times shown as US Central time.

|- style="background:#fff;"
| 1 || November 5 || @ Toronto Six || 2–3 || OT || Leveille || Canlan Ice Sports – York || 0–0–1 || 1 || 
|- style="background:#fcc;"
| 2 || November 6 || @ Toronto Six || 2–3 ||  || Leveille || Canlan Ice Sports – York || 0–1–1 || 1 || 
|- style="background:#fcc;"
| 3 || November 18 || Boston Pride || 0–2 ||  || Leveille || Richfield Ice Arena || 0–2–1 || 1 || 
|- style="background:#fff;"
| 4 || November 19 || Boston Pride || 4–5 || OT || Leveille || Richfield Ice Arena || 0–2–2 || 2 || 
|-

|- style="background:#cfc;"
| 5 || December 3 || Metropolitan Riveters || 4–3 ||  || Leveille || Richfield Ice Arena || 1–2–2 || 5 || 
|- style="background:#cfc;"
| 6 || December 4 || Metropolitan Riveters || 4–1 ||  || Leveille || Richfield Ice Arena || 2–2–2 || 8 || 
|- style="background:#fcc;"
| 7 || December 9 || @ Connecticut Whale || 0–2 ||  || Leveille || International Skating Center of CT || 2–3–2 || 8 || 
|- style="background:#cfc;"
| 8 || December 10 || @ Connecticut Whale || 4–3 ||  || Leveille || International Skating Center of CT || 3–3–2 || 11 || 
|- style="background:#cfc;"
| 9 || December 17 || Montreal Force || 5–2 ||  || Leveille || Richfield Ice Arena || 4–3–2 || 14 || 
|- style="background:#fcc;"
| 10 || December 18 || Montreal Force || 1–4 ||  || Leveille || Richfield Ice Arena || 4–4–2 || 14 || 
|-

|- style="background:#cfc;"
| 11 || January 7 || @ Buffalo Beauts || 4–1 ||  || Brenneman || Northtown Center || 5–4–2 || 17 || 
|- style="background:#cfc;"
| 12 || January 8 || @ Buffalo Beauts || 5–3 ||  || Leveille || Northtown Center || 6–4–2 || 20 || 
|- style="background:#cfc;"
| 13 || January 14 || @ Metropolitan Riveters || 3–2 ||  || Leveille || The Rink at American Dream || 7–4–2 || 23 || 
|- style="background:#cfc;
| 14 || January 15 || @ Metropolitan Riveters || 4–1 ||  || Leveille || The Rink at American Dream || 8–4–2 || 26 || 
|-

|- style="background:#;"
| – || February 4 || @ Montreal Force ||  ||  ||  || Arena regional de la riviere-du-Nord ||  ||  || Postponed due to inclement weather; rescheduled for February 6.
|- style="background:#cfc;"
| 15 || February 5 || @ Montreal Force || 4–1 ||  || Leveille || Arena regional de la riviere-du-Nord || 9–4–2 || 29 || 
|- style="background:#cfc;"
| 16 || February 6 || @ Montreal Force || 3–2 ||  || Leveille || Arena regional de la riviere-du-Nord || 10–4–2 || 32 || Rescheduled from February 4.
|- style="background:#fcc;"
| 17 || February 18 || Buffalo Beauts || 2–4 ||  || Brenneman || Richfield Ice Arena || 10–5–2 || 32 || 
|- style="background:#fcc;"
| 18 || February 19 || Buffalo Beauts || 0–1 ||  || Brenneman || Richfield Ice Arena || 10–6–2 || 32 || 
|- style="background:#fcc;"
| 19 || February 25 || Toronto Six || 0–1 ||  || Brenneman || Richfield Ice Arena || 10–7–2 || 32 || 
|- style="background:#fcc;"
| 20 || February 26 || Toronto Six || 1–7 ||  || Brenneman || Richfield Ice Arena || 10–8–2 || 32 || 
|-

|- style="background:#fff;"
| 21 || March 3 || @ Boston Pride || 4–5 || SO || Brenneman || Warrior Ice Arena || 10–8–3 || 33 || 
|- style="background:#fcc;"
| 22 || March 4 || @ Boston Pride || 1–5 ||  || Brenneman || Warrior Ice Arena || 10–9–3 || 33 || 
|- style="background:#fcc;"
| 23 || March 11 || Connecticut Whale || 0–3 ||  || Leveille || Richfield Ice Arena || 10–10–3 || 33 || 
|- style="background:#fcc;"
| 24 || March 12 || Connecticut Whale || 1–3 ||  || Leveille ||  Richfield Ice Arena || 10–11–3 || 33 || 

|- style="text-align:center;"
|

Playoffs

The Whitecaps ended the regular season as the fourth-ranked team in the league.  This earned them the final playoff spot, with their first playoff series against the first-place Boston Pride starting on Thursday, March 16 at Bentley Arena in Waltham, Massachusetts.

|- style="background:#cfc;"
| 1 || March 16 || Boston Pride || 5–2 || || Leveille || Bentley Arena || 
|- style="background:#cfc;"
| 2 || March 18 || Boston Pride || 4–1 || || Leveille || Bentley Arena || 
|- style="background:#;"
| 3 || March 26 || Toronto Six/Connecticut Whale || 8:00 || || || Mullett Arena ||

Player statistics

.

Skaters

Goaltenders

Bold/italics denotes franchise record.

Awards and honors

Three Stars of the Week

 For the weekend of December 3–4, Sydney Brodt was named Third Star of the Week in the PHF.
 For the weekend of December 16-18, Natalie Snodgrass was named First Star of the Week in the PHF.
 For the weekend of January 14–15, Jonna Albers was named Third Star of the Week in the PHF.

Milestones

Records

Honors

Transactions

Signings

References

Recaps

External links
 

Minnesota Whitecaps
PHF
2022–23 PHF season
2022–23 PHF season by team